Ceserani is an Italian surname. Notable people with the surname include:

 Lamberto Ceserani (born 1953), Italian former ice dancer. 
 Victor Ceserani (1919 – 2017), British cook, teacher and writer

See also 

 Cesarini

Italian-language surnames